The 1994 Oceania Handball Championship was the first edition of the Oceania Handball Nations Cup, which took place in Canberra, Australia from 20 to 21 August 1994. Entered nations were Australia, Vanuatu and New Zealand, but Vanuatu did not compete. Australia won the right to play Romania for a spot in the World Cup.

Table

Results

References

External links
Report on Tudor Handball

Oceania Handball Nations Cup
1994 Oceania Handball Nations Cup
Oceania Handball Championship
1994 in Australian sport
Sports competitions in Canberra
August 1994 sports events in Australia
1990s in Canberra